Long Lost Son is a 2006 American thriller television film directed by Brian Trenchard-Smith. It premiered on Lifetime on July 24, 2006.

Production
Trenchard-Smith and producer Andreas Haas had previously made The Paradise Virus together, which had been successful and they reunited for this follow-up. The film was shot in 14 days on Grand Turk Island. Trenchard-Smith says Gabrielle Anwar rewrote much of her dialogue, which he thought improved the script.

The director later said the film was "not perfect":

A few things make me wince a little. Critics will probably mock it. It's my venture into Douglas Sirk emotional melodrama territory with a Caribbean flavor on a shoestring budget, but aided by a savvy music score from David Reynolds, his fourth for me. The music really helps a lot. But I am proud of the film; it delivers just what a particular audience wants. That's my job, genre by genre.

References

External links
 

2000s thriller drama films
2006 television films
2006 films
American thriller drama films
American drama television films
Films directed by Brian Trenchard-Smith
Films shot in the Turks and Caicos Islands
Lifetime (TV network) films
American thriller television films
2006 drama films
2000s English-language films
2000s American films